Indian Cemetery may refer to:

Cemeteries
Amara (Left Bank) Indian War Cemetery, Amarah, Iraq
Huron Cemetery, or Huron Indian Cemetery, in Kansas City, Kansas
Indian Mound Cemetery, Romney, West Virginia
Jane Augustine Patencio Cemetery, Palm Springs, California
La Pointe Indian Cemetery, on Madeline Island, Wisconsin
Odd Fellows' Cemetery Mound, a Native American burial mound in Ohio
Old Chief Joseph Gravesite, Joseph, Oregon
Old Indian Cemetery, West Brookfield, Massachusetts
Sherman Indian High School Cemetery, Riverside, California
Stockbridge Indian Cemetery, Stockbridge, Wisconsin
Wampanoag Royal Cemetery, Lakeville, Massachusetts

Other
Lyng v. Northwest Indian Cemetery Protective Ass'n, a United States Supreme Court case